The 2019–20 season was Raith Rovers' third season in the third tier of Scottish football since being relegated from the Scottish Championship via the play-offs at the end of the 2016–17 season. Raith Rovers also competed in the Challenge Cup, League Cup, the Scottish Cup & the Fife Cup.

Summary

Management

Raith were led by manager John McGlynn for the 2019–20 season for his 2nd season at the club.

Results & fixtures

Pre-season

Scottish League One

Scottish Challenge Cup

Scottish League Cup

Matches

Scottish Cup

Fife Cup

Note: The Challenge Cup final was cancelled as a result of the coronavirus situation and Raith Rovers & Inverness CT declared joint winners.

The Fife Cup was declared abandoned on 22 March 2020 & league matches were declared over on 15 April 2020.

Player statistics

Squad 
Last updated 7 March 2020

|}

Squad numbers are not compulsory in Scottish League One.

Disciplinary record
Includes all competitive matches.

Last updated March 2020

Team statistics

League table

League Cup table

Management statistics
Last updated on 7 March 2020

Notes

References

Raith Rovers F.C. seasons
Raith Rovers